Thomas Alexander Lacey (1853–1931), was an English Anglican Divine known as an advocate of the re-union of the Church of England with Rome.

Lacey was born in Nottingham. Educated at a Nottingham Grammar School, Lacey obtained a scholarship to Balliol College, University of Oxford aged seventeen. While a student, he became friends with Charles Gore and was a contemporary at Oxford with future Prime Minister H. H. Asquith. Following university, he worked first as a teacher at Wakefield Grammar School, and was ordained a deacon by the Bishop of Ripon in 1876. Two years later the Bishop raised him to the priesthood. He was made Canon of Worcester in 1918.

Sources

Lacey, Thomas Alexander in The Oxford Dictionary of the Christian Church, Ed. F. L. Cross, London: Oxford University Press, 1957.
Thomas Alexander Lacey, in Lead, Kindly Light: Studies of Saints and Heroes of the Oxford Movement, Desmond Morse-Boycott, New York: Macmillan, 1933. (online at: http://anglicanhistory.org/bios/kindly/lacey.html)

1853 births
1931 deaths
19th-century English Anglican priests
20th-century English Anglican priests